The 2016 Iowa State Cyclones football team represented Iowa State University in the 2016 NCAA Division I FBS football season. Playing as a member of the Big 12 Conference (Big 12), the team played its home games at Jack Trice Stadium in Ames, Iowa. They were led by first-year head coach Matt Campbell. They finished the season 3–9, 2–7 in Big 12 play to finish in ninth place.

Previous season
The 2015 Iowa State Cyclones football team finished the regular season 3–9.

Personnel

Coaching staff

Schedule
Iowa State announced their 2016 football schedule on November 19, 2015. The 2016 schedule comprised 7 home and 5 away games in the regular season. The Cyclones hosted Big 12 foes Baylor, Kansas State, Oklahoma, Texas Tech, and West Virginia and traveled to TCU, Oklahoma State, Texas, and Kansas. For non-conference games, the Cyclones hosted San Jose State and in–state rival UNI and traveled to face in-state rival Iowa.

Schedule Source:

Game summaries

Game 1: vs. Northern Iowa Panthers

Game 2: vs. Iowa Hawkeyes

Game 3: at TCU Horned Frogs

Game 4: vs. San Jose State Spartans

Game 5: vs. Baylor Bears

Game 6: at Oklahoma State Cowboys

Game 7: vs. Texas Longhorns

Game 8: vs. Kansas State Wildcats

Game 9: vs. Oklahoma Sooners

Game 10: at Kansas Jayhawks

Game 11: vs. Texas Tech Red Raiders

Game 12: vs. West Virginia Mountaineers

Awards and honors

References

Iowa State
Iowa State Cyclones football seasons
Iowa State Cyclones football